Lorenzo Kevin Spinelli (born 3 December 2002) is an English professional footballer who plays as a striker for Ashton United.

Career
He made his senior debut for Accrington Stanley on 4 September 2020, in the EFL Cup. On 12 November 2021, he joined Northern Premier League Premier Division side Radcliffe on a one-month loan, staying with them until January.

On 4 March 2022, Spinelli joined Northern Premier League Premier Division side Bamber Bridge on a one-month loan deal. He signed for Ashton United in August 2022.

References

2002 births
Living people
English footballers
Accrington Stanley F.C. players
Radcliffe F.C. players
Bamber Bridge F.C. players
Ashton United F.C. players
Northern Premier League players
Association football forwards